News Gothic is a sans-serif typeface designed by Morris Fuller Benton, and was released in 1908 by his employer American Type Founders (ATF). The typeface is similar in proportion and structure to Franklin Gothic, also designed by Benton, but lighter.

News Gothic, like other Benton sans serif typefaces, follows the grotesque model, resembling serif text faces of the period, with a double-storey lower-case 'a' and 'g'. Also distinctive are the blunt terminus at the apex of the lowercase 't', and the location of the tail of the uppercase 'Q' completely outside the bowl. The letter forms are compact, and descenders are shallow. The typeface differs from other grotesque sans-serifs in its rather light weight and open letterforms, contributing to a less severe, humanist tone of voice. 

For much of the twentieth century, News Gothic was used in newspaper and magazine publishing with copies available on Monotype and Intertype machines for hot metal typesetting. Both companies added additional weights to the family. For use in headlines, it was designed with condensed and extra-condensed styles.

'Gothic' was an early twentieth century term for sans-serifs, found mostly in the United States and Canada. It was also used in the UK, along with 'grotesque'. In Germany the term 'Grotesk' was used.

Metal type release

Benton's autobiographical notes list the following designs as his contributions to the family:
News Gothic
News Gothic Condensed
News Gothic Extra Condensed
ATF's 1923 specimen book also shows:
News Gothic Extra Condensed Title (a headline face)
As with Franklin Gothic, the foundry expanded the line sometime later, adding two more variants:

News Gothic Bold (1958) designed by John L. “Bud” Renshaw; Intertype had already released a bold News Gothic in a hot metal typesetting version, however, as later did Monotype.
News Gothic Condensed Bold (1965) designed by Frank Bartuska; versions also by Monotype and Intertype

Both Monotype and Intertype released oblique versions; McGrew reports that while ATF's archives contained 1912 production drawings for an oblique "we have no record of its production".

Cold type copies
Virtually all producers of cold type offered their own versions of News Gothic under different names:

News Gothic — Alphatype, Autologic, Berthold, Compugraphic, Dymo,  Harris, MGD Graphic Systems, Monotype,  Varityper
Gothstar Trade — Star/Photon
Toledo — Graphic Systems Inc.

Digital releases

Because there is no active descendant of the American Type Founders Corporation making digital typefaces, News Gothic has been revived in digital form in many different versions from different sources.

Benton Sans is a greatly expanded font family based on News Gothic by Font Bureau, adding additional features such as wide styles and extra-bold weights. At 80 styles, it is one of the most comprehensive digital renditions of the News Gothic style. Its users include Newsweek, Fortune magazine, the Boston Globe and Sotheby's.

Digital releases actually named News Gothic have a variety of features, often adding in weights not present in the original design or removing some less popular ones. For example, Bitstream's release is rare in including the extra-condensed styles. URW++'s (also sold by Fontsite) is only sold in one width but in a wide range of weights and with italics for every weight, while Linotype's lacks a light weight or any condensed styles. Monotype's revival, a subset of which is included with many Microsoft products, features the condensed style but not extra-condensed, and has wider spacing than several others. Adobe, Monotype, Linotype and Bitstream have their own versions. The Bitstream version of News Gothic was extended with Cyrillic glyphs in 2005 and Greek glyphs in 2009 by Dmitry Kirsanov for ParaType, and is sold by them separately.

Hamburg Serial is a lesser-known version of News Gothic by SoftMaker, with italics that have a one-story 'a' and 'g'.

News Gothic No. 2 is an enhanced version of News Gothic produced by the D. Stempel AG type foundry in 1984. It adds more weights to the News Gothic family than were available in other versions.

Adobe Source Sans Pro is a single-width design based on News Gothic, but differs in having true italics and a larger x-height for use with onscreen display. It was released in 2012 as Adobe's first open-source family under the SIL Open Font License; Adobe's training material highlights it as having a more consistent colour on the page than the rather condensed News Gothic.

News Cycle is an open-source variant by Nathan Willis based on 1908 specimens of News Gothic typeface from ATF extended with full Latin, Greek, and Cyrillic glyphs. It is an open source typeface licensed under the SIL Open Font License.

Similar designs
Linotype called their similar design Trade Gothic while the Ludlow version was known as Record Gothic.   Intertype copied the face under the same name and added a variant, News Gothic Bold (1955). Baltimore Type's copy was called Balto Gothic, while their copy of  Inland Type Foundry's Inland Gothic No. 6 was perversely sold under the name News Gothic.

In 1916, Sol Hess made alternate rounded characters for News Gothic Extra Condensed and the resulting face was sold by Lanston Monotype as Jefferson Gothic, which was also sold by Baltimore Type as Tourist Extra Condensed  In 1935, M.F. Benton did much the same thing for A.T.F. and the face was called Phenix.

Ludlow's Record Gothic began as a mere knock-off but, between 1956 and 1961, their in-house designer, R. Hunter Middleton made many original additions to the family including:
Record Gothic Condensed Italic
Record Gothic Extended + Italic
Record Gothic Bold + Italic
Record Gothic Bold Condensed
Record Gothic Bold Extended + Italic
Record Gothic Bold Extended Reverse
Record Gothic Thinline condensed
Record Gothic Heavy Condensed
Record Gothic Light Medium-Extended
Record Gothic Medium-Extended + Italic
Record Gothic Bold Medium-Extended
Record Gothic Heavy Medium-Extended

Record Gothic is, again, a very inconsistent family, and has never been fully digitised.

Yu Gothic is a Japanese font bundled with some versions of Windows, but the Latin glyphs look similar to News Gothic. The fonts are otherwise unrelated.

Usages 

The identity for the Brooklyn Academy of Music, designed by Michael Bierut, heavily uses News Gothic.
The text in figures of the scientific general Nature Magazine is set in News Gothic.
The bold variant of News Gothic is used in the logo for the Swedish pop group ABBA, a logo conceived in 1976 by Rune Söderqvist. The scanning used for the logo comes from Adobe, not Monotype. The font is/was also used in promotional materials for the group, as well as CD and DVD liner notes.
News Gothic Bold is also used in the artwork for The Fame Monster by Lady Gaga.
News Gothic Bold was used in Saul Bass' opening title sequence for Alfred Hitchcock's 1960 thriller, Psycho.
News Gothic Bold was used in the Star Wars opening crawl for the main body of the text, as well as for the closing credits of each of the films in that series.
The version of News Gothic that was on IBM typesetters was used widely by Fluxus artists such as George Maciunas (in his Fluxpublications) and George Brecht (in his event scores).
The logo adopted by Polaroid Corporation in the late 1950s, designed by Paul Giambarba, is set in News Gothic, as was much of the type on the company's packaging and documentation up until the 1980s.
General Electric used a variant of the News Gothic typeface in transition from 2003 until they debuted the GE Inspira typeface in July 2004.
The Sims 4 uses the News Gothic typeface as most of the text in the game.
The CTV Television Network once used the font in their news programming.
 Porsche have used News Gothic in their promotion booklets and advertisements.
 The numbers on the vertical split-flap displays found in game shows from the late 1960s through the 1970s used News Gothic Bold.
 The letter tiles in the original American version of Scrabble are in News Gothic.
The Halton Catholic District School Board uses News Gothic as the primary typeface in all of its communications and reports, as well as its logo.
Heidelberg Gothic, a variant of News Gothic, is the house font of the Heidelberg Gruppe.
JCP News Gothic commissioned by JC Penney consists of two new weights coordinated with Monotype News Gothic, and is designed for use in advertising campaigns.
The primary State Farm typeface is SF News Gothic, a branded version of News Gothic.
 The Spanish airport operator Aena uses it for airport signage.

Bibliography 
Baines, Phil, Hastam, Andrew. Type and Typography. Watson-Guptill Publications: 2005. .
Blackwell, Lewis. 20th Century Type. Yale University Press: 2004. .
Fiedl, Frederich, Nicholas Ott and Bernard Stein. Typography: An Encyclopedic Survey of Type Design and Techniques Through History, Black Dog & Leventhal: 1998. .
Jaspert, W. Pincus, W. Turner Berry and A. F. Johnson. The Encyclopædia of Type Faces, Blandford Press Lts.: 1953, 1983. .
Macmillan, Neil. An A–Z of Type Designers. Yale University Press: 2006. .
Meggs, Phillip B. Revival of the Fittest, RC Publications, Inc: 2002. .

References

External links 
 ATF's 1912 specimen book, showing News Gothic on pages 698-709. Many sample settings including ads and newspaper designs.
 ATF's 1923 specimen book (their legendary last major specimen before the Depression), showing News Gothic and many related types. News Gothic samples are 472-477 (original page numbers).
 News/Trade/Franklin Gothic alternatives - survey by Stephen Coles

Grotesque sans-serif typefaces
Newspaper and magazine typefaces
American Type Founders typefaces
American gothic typefaces
Typefaces and fonts introduced in 1908
Monotype typefaces
Typefaces designed by Morris Fuller Benton